Hamid Rhanem (born January 29, 1981 in Romorantin-Lanthena#, France) is a French football midfielder. His former teams are AEK Larnaca, Enosis Neon Paralimni, Ayia Napa FC, Associação Naval 1º de Maio, S.C. Salgueiros, C.D. Aves and Nea Salamina.

Honours
APOP Kinyras
 Cypriot Cup: 2008–09

References

External links
 

a jouer en 2001/02 a l'as salbris football(cfa2)

1981 births
Living people
French footballers
Moroccan footballers
Association football midfielders
French sportspeople of Moroccan descent
Associação Naval 1º de Maio players
Ayia Napa FC players
Enosis Neon Paralimni FC players
AEK Larnaca FC players
APOP Kinyras FC players
Asteras Tripolis F.C. players
C.D. Aves players
Digenis Akritas Morphou FC players
Nea Salamis Famagusta FC players
Cypriot First Division players
Cypriot Second Division players
Moroccan expatriate footballers
Expatriate footballers in Portugal
Expatriate footballers in Greece
Expatriate footballers in Cyprus
Moroccan expatriate sportspeople in Cyprus